De Kalb is a city in Bowie County, Texas, United States; it is part of the Texarkana metropolitan statistical area. Its two area codes are 430 and 903. Its ZIP code is 75559. It is in the Central Time Zone, and its population was 1,527 at the 2020 United States census.

History
On December 31, 1985, at approximately 5:14 pm, a Douglas DC-3 private aircraft, N711Y, owned by Ricky Nelson, with a pilot, co-pilot, and seven passengers, including Nelson, his fiancée, and five members of his band, crashed in a wooded area near De Kalb. The plane was on a flight from Guntersville, Alabama, to Dallas, Texas, where Nelson was scheduled to appear at a New Year's Eve performance. All seven passengers were killed in the accident when the plane caught fire. The pilot and co-pilot were able to escape and survived.

Geography

De Kalb is located at  (33.508016, –94.616264).

The climate in this area is characterized by hot, humid summers (average of 30 or more days of 100 degrees F or more) and generally mild to cool winters. According to the Köppen Climate Classification system, De Kalb has a humid subtropical climate, abbreviated "Cfa" on climate maps.

Demographics

As of the 2020 United States census, there were 1,527 people, 631 households, and 362 families residing in the city.

At of the census of 2000, there were 1,769 people, 725 households, and 477 families residing in the city. The racial makeup of the city was 66.70% White, 30.81% African American, 0.57% Native American, 0.06% Asian, 0.68% from other races, and 1.19% from two or more races. Hispanic or Latino of any race were 2.43% of the population.

In 2020, the U.S. Census Bureau reported a population of 1,527 people living in the city. According to the 2020 census and 2020 American Community Survey's 5-year estimates program, the majority of the population has remained predominantly non-Hispanic white, though Black or African Americans remained second largest racial and ethnic group, followed by Hispanic and Latino Americans.

The median income for a household in the city was $23,713, and the median income for a family was $32,212 at the 2000 census. Males had a median income of $27,955 versus $20,750 for females. The per capita income for the city was $14,360. About 25.3% of families and 28.3% of the population were below the poverty line, including 44.3% of those under age 18 and 25.0% of those age 65 or over. By the publication of the 2020 census estimates, the median household income increased to $34,178. There was a mean income of $55,765 according to census estimates.

Education
The city of De Kalb is served by the De Kalb Independent School District.

Communities Hubbard and Dalby Springs lie south of De Kalb on US Highway 259 and most children attend the De Kalb ISD school system; however Hubbard does have its own small school district serving Pre-K through 8th grades. Some children elect to attend Hubbard in their formative years.

Notable people
 Dan Blocker, birthplace of Bonanza star who played the character "Hoss Cartwright" on the NBC television Western series
 Terrance Ganaway, former NFL running back
 Al Perkins is a musician, singer-songwriter, and producer
 Timothy Rhea, Director of Bands and Music Activities at Texas A&M University and a former president of the American Bandmasters Association, graduated from De Kalb High School
 Luke Walker is a former pitcher in Major League Baseball who played between 1965 and 1974 for the Pittsburgh Pirates (1965–1966 and 1968–1973) and Detroit Tigers (1974)

References

External links
 Home

Cities in Bowie County, Texas
Cities in Texas
Cities in Texarkana metropolitan area